United Nations Security Council resolution 639, adopted unanimously on 31 July 1989, after recalling previous resolutions on the topic, as well as studying the report by the Secretary-General on the United Nations Interim Force in Lebanon (UNIFIL) approved in 426 (1978), the Council decided to extend the mandate of UNIFIL for a further six months until 31 January 1990.

The Council then reemphasised the mandate of the Force and requested the Secretary-General to report back on the progress made with regard to the implementation of resolutions 425 (1978) and 426 (1978).

See also 
 Israeli–Lebanese conflict
 Lebanese Civil War
 List of United Nations Security Council Resolutions 601 to 700 (1987–1991)
 South Lebanon conflict (1985–2000)

References
Text of the Resolution at undocs.org

External links
 

 0639
 0639
Israeli–Lebanese conflict
1989 in Israel
1989 in Lebanon
Arab–Israeli peace process
 0639
July 1989 events